Nazim Bakırcı (born 29 May 1986 in Konya) is a Turkish cyclist, who last rode for .

Major results

2008
 2nd  Road race, National Road Championships
2009
 2nd  Road race, National Road Championships
2010
 7th Overall Tour of Victory
2011
 1st  Overall Tour of Victory
1st Stage 3
 National Road Championships
2nd Road race
7th Time trial
 2nd Overall Tour of Isparta
1st Stage 3
 2nd Overall Tour of Alanya
 3rd Overall Tour of Marmara
 4th Overall Tour of Gallipoli
 6th Overall Tour of Trakya
2013
 1st  Road race, National Road Championships
2014
 5th Road race, National Road Championships
2015
 1st  Overall Tour of Ankara
1st Stage 1
 5th Road race, National Road Championships
 10th Overall Tour of Aegean
2016
 1st  Overall Tour of Mersin
1st  Mountains classification
 1st  Points classification Tour of Ankara
 10th Balkan Elite Road Classics
2017
 9th Overall Tour de Serbie
 9th Overall Tour of Mersin
1st Mountains classification
 10th Overall Tour d'Azerbaïdjan
2018
 1st  Overall Tour of Mesopotamia
1st Stage 1
 8th Overall Tour of Cappadocia

References

External links

1986 births
Living people
Turkish male cyclists
21st-century Turkish people